Shihab al-Din Abu al-Abbas Ahmad ibn Fadlallah al-Umari, commonly known as Ibn Fadlallah al-Umari or Ibn Faḍl Allāh al-‘Umārī (1301 – 1349) was an Arab historian born in Damascus. His major works include at-Taʾrīf bi-al-muṣṭalaḥ ash-sharīf, on the subject of the Mamluk administration, and Masālik al-abṣār fī mamālik al-amṣār, an encyclopedic collection of related information. The latter was translated into French by Maurice Gaudefroy-Demombynes in 1927.

A student of Ibn Taymiyya, Ibn Fadlallah visited Cairo shortly after the Malian Mansa Kankan Musa I's pilgrimage to Mecca, and his writings are one of the primary sources for this legendary hajj.  He recorded that the Mansa dispensed so much gold that its value fell in Egypt for a decade afterward, a story that is often repeated in describing the wealth of the Mali Empire.

He recorded Kankan Musa's stories of the previous mansa; Kankan Musa claimed that the previous ruler had abdicated the throne to journey to a land across the ocean, leading contemporary Malian historian Gaoussou Diawara to theorize that Abu Bakr II reached the Americas years before Christopher Columbus.

Works
 Ibn Faḍl Allāh al-‘Umārī, Masālik al-abṣār, éd. Sayyid

References

External links

1300 births
1384 deaths
14th-century people from the Mamluk Sultanate
14th-century Syrian historians
Historians from the Mamluk Sultanate
Arabs from the Mamluk Sultanate